Jann-Peter Janssen (12 February 1945 – 7 December 2022) was a German politician. A member of the Social Democratic Party, he served in the Bundestag from 1994 to 2005.

Janssen died in Ihlow on 7 December 2022, at the age of 77.

References

1945 births
2022 deaths
People from Norden, Lower Saxony
Members of the Bundestag 1994–1998
Members of the Bundestag 1998–2002
Members of the Bundestag 2002–2005
Recipients of the Cross of the Order of Merit of the Federal Republic of Germany